Hennersdorf may refer to:

Germany
Hennersdorf (Augustusburg), Augustusburg, Saxony
 , Dippoldiswalde, Saxony
Hennersdorf (Doberlug-Kirchhain), Doberlug-Kirchhain, Brandenburg
Hennersdorf (Kamenz), Kamenz, Saxony
Hennersdorf (Schmiedeberg), Schmiedeberg (Erzgebirge), Saxony
Poland
former name of Jędrzychowice, Zgorzelec County
former name of Jędrzychowice, Strzelin County
Czech Republic
Hennersdorf, former German name of Dubnice, Liberec Region
Hennersdorf, former German name of Jindřichov (Bruntál District), Moravian-Silesian Region
Austria
Hennersdorf, Mödling District, Lower Austria

See also
Katholisch Hennersdorf
Großhennersdorf